Robert Griffiths (9 November 1903 – 1970) was a Scottish professional footballer who played as an defender.

Club career
Griffiths signed for Chelsea in 1931 from Pollok in his native Scotland. He spent ten years with Chelsea, often playing as captain. He joined the Wartime Police Reserve during the Second World War, but remained registered to Chelsea.

References

1903 births
1970 deaths
Scottish footballers
Association football defenders
Pollok F.C. players
Chelsea F.C. players